Högsby Municipality is a municipality in Kalmar County, south-eastern Sweden. Its seat is located in the town Högsby.

The latest nationwide subdivision reform in Sweden was centred on the year 1971. In this area the amalgamation took place already in 1969 when Fagerhult joined Högsby.

The municipality has the smallest population of the municipalities of Kalmar County. The population increase has been insignificant - in 1908 the parish had some 5,000 inhabitants. The municipality itself was created with the Swedish municipal reform in 1971.

History
Högsby Municipality has a history tracing back to the medieval age, around 1,200 BC. In the 15th and 16th century it was involved in conquests by the Danish soldiers, and Swedish king Gustav Vasa in his quest to find revolutionary Nils Dacke hideout and supporters in the Småland forests demolished Högsby.

In the municipality are also several old churches of interests with some old archifacts.

Geography
In total, most of the municipality consists of forest and water areas; some of it has been made nature reserves hosting rare animals and plants.

Other sights are the streams and lakes that offer opportunities for fishing, bathing and canoeing, or just as nature experiences. It reflects itself in the coat of arms, showing water. The most notable streams are Emån and Alsterån; with Allgunnen being the largest lake.

Localities
There are 5 urban areas (also called a Tätort or locality) in Högsby Municipality.

In the table the localities are listed according to the size of the population as of December 31, 2005. The municipal seat is in bold characters.

International relations

Twin towns — sister cities
The municipality is twinned with:
 Vörå, Finland
 Berga, Spain

References
Statistics Sweden

External links

Högsby Municipality - Official site
 Article Högsby from Nordisk Familjebok

Municipalities of Kalmar County